Nilesh Sable is a Marathi television show host and film actor from Maharashtra, India. He is the host of the Marathi TV show Chala Hawa Yeu Dya.

Early life
He has completed his secondary school from Mahatma Gandhi Vidyalaya, Dahiwadi and Junior college from Mahatma Gandhi Vidyalaya Junior college, Dahiwadi. He has a Masters of Science in Ayurvedic medicine.

Personal life 
Nilesh was married with his childhood friend Gauri Sable in 2013. He does not have a kid.

Career
Nilesh Sable began his acting career after winning the Zee Marathi reality series, Maharashtracha Superstar in 2010. He then appeared on series such as Home Minister and Fu Bai Fu. He made Marathi film debut in Navra Majha Bhavra. He is the host of Zee Marathi comic Show Chala Hawa Yeu Dya.

Filmography

Films

Television

Awards

References

External links
 Nilesh Sable at IMDb

Indian male film actors
Male actors in Marathi cinema
Living people
People from Kolhapur
Indian television presenters
1986 births
Male actors in Marathi television